Patrik Lostedt (born March 19, 1981) is a Finnish professional ice hockey player who used to play for Espoo Blues of the SM-liiga. He currently plays for Bewe Hockey.

Career statistics

See also
Ice hockey in Finland

References

External links

1981 births
Living people
Espoo Blues players
Finnish ice hockey left wingers
HC Salamat players
HIFK (ice hockey) players
Ice hockey people from Helsinki
Kiekko-Vantaa players
Mikkelin Jukurit players